The Hep Cat is a 1942 Warner Bros. Looney Tunes cartoon directed by Bob Clampett, written by Warren Foster, animated primarily by Robert McKimson, and set to a musical score composed by Carl W. Stalling. The short was released on October 3, 1942. This cartoon was the first Technicolor Looney Tunes short.

Plot
The Hep Cat opens with a cat strolling through an abandoned lot. Unfortunately, he stumbles across a dog named Rosebud who gives chase. The cat, after a successful escape, begins singing a parody of "Java Jive". Later, the cat encounters an attractive female cat, and attempts to woo her, failing utterly. A package containing flowers and a lipstick-kissed note is tossed over the fence; the note invites the cat to rendezvous with "guess who?" on the other side of the fence. He prances over and comes face-to-face with Rosebud. The chase resumes.

At one point, the dog uses a puppet version of the female cat of Hep Cat's dreams to trap him. The cat is fooled and again the dog pursues him.

After a series of zany sight gags, the cat once again evades Rosebud and puts him out of commission. As the cartoon closes, the cat can be seen kissing his dream girl—the puppet.

Voice cast
Mel Blanc as the Hep Cat
Sara Berner as Cat Puppet, Bird
Kent Rogers as Rosebud

Title alterations
When Cartoon Network aired this short on The Bob Clampett Show, the titles were replaced with title cards of a colorized Porky Pig Looney Tune, with "The Merry-Go-Round Broke Down" as the opening music. The Looney Tunes title card cuts to the Blue Ribbon title card with "Merrily We Roll Along" as title music. The Looney Tunes drum with Porky Pig saying That's All Folks!, also closes the cartoon. This was done to identify the short as a Looney Tune, since the Blue Ribbon titles miscredited the short as a Merrie Melodies Short.

Cultural references

When the cat claims to be a "gorgeous hunk of man" his face turns into a caricature of Victor Mature. As the cat feels Rosebud's nose beside the puppet he is kissing he exclaims: "Well, something new has been added!" At the end of the cartoon the cat says: "Well, I can dream, can't I?" Both quotes are catch phrases by Jerry Colonna. "Ah, something new has been added" was a slogan for Old Gold (cigarette).

Reception
Comic book and animation writer Earl Kress writes, "This cartoon is one of director Bob Clampett's bat-out-of-hell-paced efforts... There's some really nice staging in this cartoon—for example, the scenes in which we only see shadows on a fence and the scene where the cat and dog race up a fire escape, shown at a steep down-angle from the top of a building. The staging, plus the outstanding script by Warren Foster, make this one of the greatest Looney Tunes."

References

External links
 
 

1942 animated films
1942 films
Looney Tunes shorts
Warner Bros. Cartoons animated short films
Films directed by Bob Clampett
Films scored by Carl Stalling
1940s Warner Bros. animated short films
1940s English-language films